James Meadows (March 2, 1817 – July 13, 1902), was an English-born immigrant who came to California in 1838. He was the oldest pioneer in Monterey County, California at his death. He donated land and helped build the Carmelo School, which was the earliest school in Carmel Valley, California. The Meadows legacy exists today in the Meadows Tract and he and his families contributions to the Carmel Valley History. His daughter, Isabel Meadows, was an Ohlone ethnologist and the last fluent speaker of the Rumsen Ohlone language.

Early life 

James Meadows was born on March 2, 1817, in the seaport town of Great Yarmouth, in Norfolk, England. He left home at an early age and went to sea as an apprentice on board a collier ship. He then left London, England in March 1835, at age 18, on the whaling ship Indian. After 2 1/2 years he and a friend, William Anderson, father of former Assessor Anderson of Castroville, deserted his ship at the Monterey Harbor in 1837 because of cruel treatment they had received. At this time Monterey was the capital of Alta California. They took refuge with Domingo Peralta and his family until his ship left the Monterey Bay. Domingo was from the Esselen, a Native American tribe that lived in the area, and was married to Maria Loreta Onésimo (1819–1892). Loreta was the daughter of Mission Indians Juan Onésimo (1796–1860) and Maria Ignacia (1880–). Juan helped to build the Carmel Mission San Carlos. Loreta was born at the Carmel Mission and was Rumsen-Esselen. Loreta's grandmother Lupecina Francesa Unegte had been baptized at the Mission in 1792 when about 800 Native Americans lived there.

In 1836, when the mission pasture lands were divided into large land grants called ranchos, Loreta and Domingo were given a large tract by the mission padres for her marriage to Domingo, which they cultivated and planted with corn, tomatoes, and onions. José Antonio Romero, Carmel Mission civil administrator, threatened the Peraltas with eviction because they had no written deed to the property and since they were Indians, their claim to the land grant was easily challenged. Governor Juan Bautista Alvarado awarded the grant to A. Romero on January 27, 1840.

Professional life

Meadows took his first job as vaquero for Captain Juan Bautista Roger Cooper on Rancho El Sur in Monterey County in Big Sur for 2 1/2 years during the Mexican rule in California. During his time there he became associated with the saloon of Isaac Graham, a hideout for deserters from foreign ships. Graham led a group of American and European immigrants who supported Juan Bautista Alvarado and José Castro in the coup against Mexican Governor of Northern California Nicolás Gutiérrez. In April 1840, the Mexican government raided the tavern and arrested Meadows and 46 white Americans and others for not having a passport. He was sent by ship to Tepic, Mexico where he spent 14 months in prison, which resulted in a diplomatic crisis called the Graham Affair.

In July 1941, Meadows obtained clemency and was returned from Mexico, with a group of 20. He became associated with General Bidwell on the Feather River in Sacramento County, California. He said that Bidwell, Pitts, and he and his companions "discovered gold there before James Marshall, but kept it a secret."

Isabel Meadows

Meadows returned to Monterey and went back to visit the Peralta family when he found out that his friend Domingo Peralta had mysteriously been found dead. In 1842, Meadows married Maria Loreta Onésimo in Monterey, California, the widow of Domingo Peralta, and took responsibility for the land she was given by the mission padres. Meadows and Loreta had five children together in 15 years, Francisco (Frank) Yates (1844–1916); Isabel Meadows (1846–1935); Edwardo (Edward) Lion (1851–1898); James A. Jr. (1856–); and Thomas Porter (1860–1940).

Their daughter, Isabel Meadows, "Aunt Belle," was born on July 7, 1846, the day of the Battle of Monterey that occurred during the Mexican–American War. The United States captured the town and Commodore John Drake Sloat raised the flag of the United States over the Monterey Custom House. She grew up in her parents' home in Carmel Valley where she learned the Rumsen tribal culture. She also learned to speak the native Rumsen language from her mother, Loreta Onésimo, spoken by the Ohlone people.

In 1933, at age 87, Isabel was invited to Washington D.C., to assist Professor John Peabody Harrington an ethnologist of the Smithsonian Institution's Bureau of American Ethnology with his research on the Rumsen life, language, and culture in the Carmel Valley and Big Sur regions. Isabel was last known speaker of their language. They worked together until she died on May 20, 1939, at age 94, in Washington D.C. The novel Cathedral in the Sun, by Anne Benson Fisher has a chapter titled, To the memory of Isabella Meadows. In 1949, the Meadows Cave, in which an Esselen child was found buried, was discovered by a survey party under the direction of A.R. Piling, then assistant Archaeologist of the U.C. Archaeological Survey. The cave was renamed after Isabella Meadows, as the last known informant on the Esselen Native Americans.

James Meadows Tract

In 1846, José Antonio Romero sold the  Palo Escrito Mexican land grant to William Garner in January 1847. Monterey businessman Thomas O. Larkin, who had acquired several land grants in California after the Mexican Cession of California to the United States following the Mexican-American War, bought the deed from Garner and sold it to Meadows in 1848. The name Palo Escrito, in Spanish means "written stick." The name was used for this land as early as 1828 by Father Vincent de Sarria and Father Ramon Abella of the Carmel Mission. 

On December 28, 1958, Meadows became an American citizen. Before his wife's father, Juan Onésimo died in 1860, Meadows filed a claim for the Palo Escrito land grant on November 5, 1869, with the Public Land Commission. Its boundaries were between the Rancho Cañada de la Segunda to the west, Rancho Los Laureles to the northeast, and Garland Ranch Regional Park to the south.

The Palo Escrito area was the home of Rumsen people, like Eulalia Cushar. On the property Meadows had a dairy where he hired jobless Chinese workers. He built an adobe house near the Carmel River.

Carmelo School

Meadows was known for his generosity. He donated land and helped establish, what was first called the Meadows School, and later renamed the Carmelo School. It was the earliest school in Carmel Valley. It still stands just west of Mid-Valley Fire Station and across Carmel Valley Road from the present Carmelo School. He was a trustee of the Carmelo School District until his death

William Brainard Post worked on the Meadows Ranch and met Loreta's sister Anselma Mary Onesimo (1827–1902). Post and Anselma were married in 1850. Post became a rancher in the Big Sur area where Posts, California is named for his descendants.

On July 7, 1846, Isaac Hitchcock came to Monterey as standard-bearer for Commodore Sloat. After his military discharge, he acquired a piece of land in Carmel Valley and became acquainted with the Meadows family. Loreta's half-sister, Magdelena Peralta (1836–1892) and Hitchcock became friends and they were married. Their son, Joseph John Hitchcock (1856–1937) became well known in Carmel Valley worked on the Rancho Los Laureles.

On San Carlos Day, November 4, 1879, Scottish novelist Robert Louis Stevenson visited the Carmel Mission to hear the a mass at the church that had fallen into disrepair. A drawing by Joseph D. Strong shows Jules Simeenau, Meadows and his wife, and Father Angel Delfino Casanova standing in front of the church.

Death

Meadows died on July 13, 1902, at his home in Carmel Valley, California, having lived a long life of 85 years. His funeral took place at the San Carlos church and he was buried in the cemetery in Monterey, California. He left an estate of  acres with assets worth over $150,000. His oldest son, Frank contested the Will because his father left him only $2,000.

Later developments
The Meadows ranch was passed to Edward L. Meadows who in turn passed it on to his son Roy E. (1886–1971). Roy and his wife Rena O. Beaverton (1887–1974) raised their children on the family property. The Meadows house was torn down in 1925 and replaced with a eight-room stucco home. In 1960, Roy and his sister Lora (Meadows) Humble sold  for $68,500 to Glayton Neil to be subdivided.

Legacy

The Meadows legacy remains strong today in the Meadows Tract, the Carmelo School, and in the family's contributions to the Carmel Valley history.

See also
 Timeline of Carmel-by-the-Sea, California
 Ranchos of California
 List of Ranchos of California

References

External links

 Meadows, the English Sailor
 Isabel Meadows Papers at the California Language Archive 
 James Meadows (1817–1902)

1817 births
1902 deaths
English people
People from Carmel Valley, California